Fran Baum  is an Australian social scientist who conducts research on the social and economic influences and determinants of health. She is director of the Southgate Institute of Health, Society and Equity at Flinders University, Australia, and became an Officer of the Order of Australia for her advocacy work on "improved access to community health care, and to professional organisations". In 2006, Baum was elected a Fellow of the Academy of the Social Sciences in Australia.

Career 
Baum works on links between poor health and social inequality. Her research on health policy and budget issues has been described numerous times in The Conversation. Baum has also given talks on panels as well as for the media, on issues including fair taxation, and health as well as links between poverty and poor health. 

Baum has spoken on a panels on de-industrialisation, plus the global social challenges which de-industrialisation brings. Her discussion focused around how, issues in various countries, such as communities struggling to adjust and adapt to de-industrialisation. "Now car manufacturing has ceased in South Australia, some have applied the 'rustbelt' epithet to the state. But the social and economic challenges it faces are part of a global phenomenon. How do you assist communities facing joblessness, the demise of old industries, as well as intergenerational disadvantage?". The symposium was recorded for an NHMRC Centre for Research Excellence for the Health Equity symposium, in Adelaide 2017.

Baum's research crosses both social and economic inequities and focuses on the resultant impacts on people's and community health. Baum also specialises in evaluating the promotion of health, including indigenous health, and healthy cities initiatives. Baum was awarded an Australian Research Council Federation Fellowship on developing effective responses from social and government perspectives, to health inequity and social exclusion. Baum has been awarded national grants investigating aspects of health inequity, also has a long-term teaching career, which has focused on public health. Baum has written a book, The New Public Health, which in 2015 was in its 4th edition.

Baum became an Officer of the Order of Australia (AO) in the 2016 Queen's Birthday Honours. Her award was for being "an advocate for improved access to community health care, and to professional organisations".

Selected publications 

Baum, F.E., Graycar, A. and Delany-Crowe, T.N. (2016). Understanding Australian Policies on Public Health. Canberra: The Academy of Social Sciences in Australia.
 Baum, F.E., Newman, L.A., Biedrzycki, K.R. and Patterson, J. (2010). Can a regional government's social inclusion initiative contribute to the quest for health equity? Health Promotion International.
 Newman, L.A., Biedrzycki, K.R. and Baum, F.E. (2010). Digital technology access and use among socially and economically disadvantaged groups in South Australia. Journal of Community Informatics, 6(2).

Books

Awards, honours and recognition 
 2017 – Fellow of the Australian Academy of Health and Medical Sciences (FAHMS)
 2016 – Officer of the Order of Australia (AO)
 2008 – Australian Research Council Federation Fellow
 2007 – Fellow, Australian Health Promotion Association
 2006 – Fellow, Academy of the Social Sciences in Australia
 1999–2000 Life Member and past National President, Public Health Association of Australia
1989 – Catherine Helen Spence Memorial Scholarship

Media and press reports 

 Baum's work on the disparity between the wealthy and poor has been described by the Sydney Morning Herald.
Baum was quoted as saying the "impact of health outcomes depended on social status", again in the Sydney Morning Herald. She said that "Poverty, poor housing, a lack of education, unemployment and social isolation were the main social determinants of ill health, but energy was not going into these areas".
The ABC quoted Baum on the impact of a university restructure.
The BMJ described Baum's comments on the 4th People's Health assembly.

References 

21st-century Australian women scientists
Australian women academics
Officers of the Order of Australia
Fellows of the Academy of the Social Sciences in Australia
Fellows of the Australian Academy of Health and Medical Sciences
Year of birth missing (living people)
Living people
Academic staff of Flinders University
Australian social scientists
Alumni of the University of Nottingham
Alumni of the University of Wales
Australian expatriates in the United Kingdom